Elckerlyc is a 1975 Dutch drama film directed by Jos Stelling and starring George Bruens. It is also known as Elckerlijc and Elkerlyc. It tells the story of a criminal who falls in love with a girl in medieval times. The film is loosely based on the 15th-century morality play with the same title. Like in Stellings's previous film, Mariken van Nieumeghen, most of the actors are non-professionals. The film was released in Dutch cinemas on 18 December 1975.

Cast
 George Bruens
 Gerard de Vos
 Henk Douze
 Bob Kars
 Johanna Leeuwenstein
 Lucie Singeling
 Frans Stelling
 Geert Thijssens
 Jan van der Steen
 Ruud van Rekum
 Nel de Vries
 Guus Westerman

References

1975 drama films
1975 films
Dutch drama films
1970s Dutch-language films
Everyman
Dutch films based on plays
Films directed by Jos Stelling
Films set in the 15th century